Giannis Saltas (born 5 March 2002) is a Greek professional footballer who plays as a goalkeeper for Super League club Atromitos.

References

2002 births
Living people
Greek footballers
Super League Greece players
Atromitos F.C. players
Association football goalkeepers